Ludmilla Jane Jordanova   (born 10 October 1949) is a British historian and academic. She is Professor of Visual Culture in the Department of History at Durham University.

Jordanova was born to a Bulgarian father and English mother. Educated at Oxford High School and New Hall, Cambridge, Professor Jordanova has taught at the universities of Oxford, Essex, York, East Anglia, Cambridge and King's College London. Previously she held the position of Director of the Centre for Research in the Arts, Social Sciences and Humanities (CRASSH), University of Cambridge and was Professor of Visual Arts at the University of East Anglia. She has two children Alix Green and Zara Figlo and one granddaughter Sam Green.

She is the author of many texts regarding the history of science, thinking, gender and art, and is commonly referred to as one of the leading British experts in the field; she has also written broadly  on the nature of her subject itself, including a book by the title History In Practice. Her most recent book, The Look of the Past: Visual and Material Evidence in Historical Practice was published by Cambridge University Press in September 2012. She was a Trustee of the National Portrait Gallery (London) from 2001 to 2009, and in summer 2011 was appointed a Trustee of the National Museum of Science and Industry.

References

External links 
 Individual page on the King's College London website
 Personal website
 Curriculum vitae
 List of Publications

1949 births
Living people
People educated at Oxford High School, England
Alumni of New Hall, Cambridge
Academics of King's College London
Academics of the University of East Anglia
English historians
British women historians
Fellows of the Royal Historical Society
British people of Bulgarian descent
English people of Bulgarian descent
Academics of Durham University